Hennadiy is a Ukrainian given name. Like the Russian variant Gennady it is derived from Gennadius. Notable people with the name include:

 Hennadiy Altman (born 1979), Ukrainian football goalkeeper
 Hennadiy Avdyeyenko (born 1963), Ukrainian high jumper
 Hennadiy Krasylnykov (born 1977), Ukrainian weightlifter
 Hennadiy Lytovchenko (born 1963), Ukrainian footballer and football coach
 Hennadiy Medvedyev (born 1975), Ukrainian footballer
 Hennadiy Moroz (born 1975), Ukrainian footballer
 Hennadiy Orbu (born 1970), Ukrainian footballer
 Hennadiy Perepadenko (born 1964), Ukrainian footballer
 Hennadiy Popovych (1973–2010), Ukrainian footballer
 Hennadiy Udovenko (born 1931), Ukrainian politician and diplomat
 Hennadiy Zubov (born 1977), Ukrainian footballer

Ukrainian masculine given names